Casey Riordan Millard (born 1973) is a Cincinnati-based artist working in a variety of media including painting, drawing, sculpture, video, and publication. Millard’s work aims to “create a temporary distraction from the weight of oneself”. She obtained a Bachelor's in Fine Art in 1994 from Ohio University in Athens, Ohio.

Work 
Millard’s artwork has been displayed in various cities and states such as Cincinnati, Ohio, Buffalo, New York, and Chicago, Illinois. The majority of Millard’s pieces include her original character, Shark Girl.

Shark Girl 
Millard’s character, Shark Girl, appears in many of her illustrations, paintings, and sculptures. Shark Girl is a young girl with the head of a shark created in 1999. She was a way for Millard to “reflect her own anxieties”.
A fiberglass sculpture of Shark Girl was built for the Ohio River Downtown with a $6,000 grant in 2012. Visitors used the piece as a photo-op, turning it to have the Ohio River in the background. Around Easter 2014, visitors began to deface Shark Girl with graffiti. The city left repairs in Millard’s hands. Soon after, Aaron Ott, the public art curator at the Albright–Knox Art Gallery in Buffalo purchased the sculpture and the museum created a fund to maintain it. The sculpture was moved to Buffalo, where it became a popular local landmark.

A YouTube video entitled “Come Follow Me” features Shark Girl. The video, created for Millard’s 2012 installation at The Contemporary Arts Center’s UnMuseum in Cincinnati, Ohio, follows Shark Girl on a journey leading her to a horse which is also featured as a sculpture in the installation. The video is 4 minutes and 11 seconds long and was uploaded to YouTube on February 12, 2013. It features drawings and animation by Millard with editing and co-direction by Ossian Mendoza and music by John Aselin.

Shark Girl is the title character in Millard’s 2014 children’s book “Shark Girl & Belly Button”.

Exhibitions

References

External links
 Shark Girl Teeth 
New Success article

Living people
1973 births
20th-century American painters
Artists from Cincinnati
Sculptors from Ohio
Ohio University alumni
20th-century American sculptors
21st-century American painters